Titanilla Bogdányi (born April 12, 1986) is a Hungarian voice actress from Budapest.

She is well known for over-dubbing for Anne Hathaway, Miley Cyrus, Lindsay Lohan, Alexis Bledel, Jena Malone, and Dania Ramirez.

Over-dubbing roles

Anime and cartoons
 Ino Yamanaka in Naruto (Animax edition)
 Melody in The Little Mermaid II: Return to the Sea
 Zoe Drake in Dinosaur King
 Orihime Inoue in Bleach
 Orihime Inoue in Bleach: Memories of Nobody
 Lisa Simpson in The Simpsons
 Lisa Simpson in The Simpsons Movie
 Izzy in Total Drama Island
 Izzy in Total Drama Action
 Izzy in Total Drama World Tour
 Taylor in Total Drama Presents: The Ridonculous Race
 Gwen in Total DramaRama
 Marie in Ed, Edd n Eddy
 Aoi Kirisawa in Kilari
 Mary Test in Johnny Test
 Ami Onuki in Hi Hi Puffy AmiYumi
 Judy Jetson in The Jetsons
 Alice Gehabich in Bakugan Battle Brawlers
 Alice Gehabich in Bakugan Battle Brawlers: New Vestroia
 Anna Heart in Kaleido Star
 Kari McKeen in The Incredibles
 Lori Mackney in What's with Andy?
 Sango in InuYasha
 Amelia Wil Tesla Seyruun in Slayers
 Ellie in Shaman King
 Reira Serizawa in Nana
 Jasmine in Deltora Quest
 Koko in Chuggington
 Atomic Betty/Betty Barrett in Atomic Betty
 Celia Hills in Inazuma Eleven
 Julia Crichton in Fullmetal Alchemist: The Sacred Star of Milosc
 Fluttershy in My Little Pony: Friendship is Magic
 Pipsqueak in The ZhuZhus
 Webbigail Vanderquack in Ducktales (2017)
 Rudy Tabootie in ChalkZone

Live action
 Lois Lane in Smallville
 Vorena the Elder in Rome
 Lisette Bracho in La usurpadora
 Cat Valentine in Victorious and Sam & Cat
 Alex Russo in Wizards of Waverly Place
 Miley Stewart/Hannah Montana in Hannah Montana

Cinema
 Nina in Day of the Dead
 Pearline in Ghost Dog: The Way of the Samurai
 Suzy Bannion in Suspiria
 Julie Powell in Julie & Julia

References

External links
 

Hungarian voice actresses
20th-century Hungarian actresses
1986 births
Living people
Actresses from Budapest